Justin Dearborn (born c. 1971) is an American businessman. He formerly served as the chairman and chief executive officer of the Tribune Publishing Company, a newspaper publishing company listed on the New York Stock Exchange and NASDAQ.

Early life
Dearborn was born circa 1971. He graduated from Illinois State University with a bachelor's degree and he received a J.D. from the DePaul University College of Law.

Career
Dearborn began his career at Motorola, and later worked for Click Commerce. He was the Managing Director and General Counsel of Merrick Ventures, a private equity firm. He served as the chief executive officer of Merge Healthcare from August 2013 to October 2015, when it merged with IBM for $1 billion.

Dearborn was appointed as the chief executive officer of Tribune Publishing in February 2016 and as its chairman in March 2018, replacing Michael Ferro. He stepped down from both roles in January 2019.

References

Living people
1970s births
Illinois State University alumni
DePaul University College of Law alumni
American chairpersons of corporations
American chief executives
American media executives
Tribune Publishing
20th-century American businesspeople
21st-century American businesspeople